Khar is a tribe found in Pakistan and is considered among the prominent tribes of Muzaffargarh District. They are a branch of the larger Kharal tribe and multiple legends exist as to why their name was shortened from Kharal to Khar.

References 

Jat tribes
Muzaffargarh District